István Nemeskürty (14 May 1925 – 8 October 2015) was a Hungarian historian, writer, screenwriter and film producer.

Career
In 1977 he was a member of the jury at the 10th Moscow International Film Festival. In 1985 he was a member of the jury at the 14th Moscow International Film Festival.

Selected filmography
 Stars of Eger (1968)
 Petőfi '73 (1973)
 The Conquest (1996)
  (2001)

References

External links

1925 births
2015 deaths
Hungarian screenwriters
Hungarian male writers
Hungarian film producers
Male screenwriters
Writers from Budapest